Top Country Albums is a chart that ranks the top-performing country music albums in the United States, published by Billboard.  In 1976, 16 different albums topped the chart, which was at the time published under the title Top Country LP's, based on sales reports submitted by a representative sample of stores nationwide.

In the issue of Billboard dated January 3, C. W. McCall was at number one with his album Black Bear Road, its second week at number one.  It would spend the first eight weeks of 1976 in the top spot before being displaced by the compilation album Wanted! The Outlaws, featuring tracks by Waylon Jennings, Willie Nelson, Jessi Colter and Tompall Glaser, which spent six weeks in the top spot.  It was the first compilation album by various artists to top the country albums chart in its 12-year history, and the first country album to receive a platinum certification from the Recording Industry Association of America.  The four artists were all associated with the outlaw country movement, which rejected the slick production values evident in popular country music of the early 1970s and added a rock music influence and a counterculture attitude.  Both Jennings and Nelson also achieved solo number ones in 1976.  Three weeks after Wanted! The Outlaws left the top spot, Nelson reached number one with The Sound in Your Mind, which would go on to spend eight weeks atop the chart.  He would return to the top spot in November with The Troublemaker, which spent three weeks at number one, meaning that, even if the time which Wanted! The Outlaws spent atop the chart is disregarded due to its status as a compilation, he spent the most weeks at number one of any act.  Jennings spent nine non-consecutive weeks at number one with Are You Ready for the Country, spanning from August to December.

In addition to Nelson, Loretta Lynn had two chart-toppers in 1976.  She spent a single week at number one in December with Somebody Somewhere and the same length of time in the top spot in August with United Talent, a collaboration with Conway Twitty.  The two singers had a run of success with duet recordings in the 1970s alongside their ongoing solo careers.  Another album of male-female duets to reach number one was Golden Ring by George Jones and Tammy Wynette.  The couple had divorced the previous year, but nonetheless continued to record together.  Three future members of the Country Music Hall of Fame achieved their first number-one albums in 1976.  In April, Emmylou Harris spent two weeks in the top spot with Elite Hotel, her first chart-topper.  In June, Don Williams began a two-week run at number one with Harmony.  Although he was extremely successful on the singles chart, achieving 17 number ones, it would prove to be his only chart-topping album.  In November, Marty Robbins spent the only week atop the country albums chart of his career with El Paso City; his greatest period of popularity had come in the late 1950s and early 1960s, prior to the launch of the listing.

Chart history

References

1976-related lists
1976
1976 record charts